Ebitimi Agogu (born 26 December 1987 in Otuan, Bayelsa State) is a footballer, who plays for Bayelsa United F.C.

Career
Agogu who started his professional career with Bayelsa United  and signed for Sharks F.C. of Port Harcourt in 2010, after two successful seasons with the side that won the 2010 WAFU Cup in Togo, he signed for Shooting Stars  F.C. but was later loaned to Ocean Boys F.C. the same season. In January 2012 returned to Sharks  He left Shooting Stars F.C. in January 2013and signed with Nembe City before returning to Bayelsa United at the start of the 2014 season.

References 

1987 births
Living people
People from Bayelsa State
Nigerian footballers
Association football forwards
Ocean Boys F.C. players
Shooting Stars S.C. players
Nembe City F.C. players